Love Wins may refer to:

Love Wins: A Book About Heaven, Hell, and the Fate of Every Person Who Ever Lived, 2011 book by pastor Rob Bell
Love Wins: The Lovers and Lawyers Who Fought the Landmark Case for Marriage Equality, 2016 book by Debbie Cenziper
"Love Wins" (song), a 2018 song by Carrie Underwood from Cry Pretty
"Love Wins", a 2016 song by Michael McArthur
"Love Wins", a 2012 song by Kari Jobe with Jason Crabb on Love Is Stronger